The Migdale Hoard is a group of early Bronze Age jewellery discovered by workmen blasting a granite knoll behind Bonar Bridge, Scotland, near what is known as "Tulloch Hill" in May 1900.

Dating from about 2000-1150 BC, the artifacts are in the custody of the National Museum of Scotland in Edinburgh. They include a bronze axe head, sets of bronze bangles and anklets, and a series of beautifully carved jet and cannel coal buttons that may well have adorned a Bronze Age jacket, bronze hair ornaments and fragments of an elaborate bronze headdress.

See also
 List of hoards in Britain

References

1900 in science 
1900 in Scotland
Collections of the National Museums of Scotland
History of the Scottish Highlands
Hoards of jewellery
Sutherland
Bronze Age Scotland
Treasure troves in Scotland
Treasure troves of Bronze Age Britain
Archaeological sites in Highland (council area)
1900 archaeological discoveries